The Bulletin for Biblical Research is the peer-reviewed journal of the Institute for Biblical Research. It was established in 1991, and is published by Eisenbrauns. BBR started as an annual journal, becoming a biannual journal in 2000 and a quarterly journal in 2009. The current editor is Craig S. Keener.

Editors
BBR has had four successive editors during its history:
 Bruce Chilton (1991–1994)
 Craig A. Evans (1994–2005)
 Richard S. Hess (2005–2015)
 Craig S. Keener (2015–present)

References

Eisenbrauns academic journals
Biblical studies journals
Publications established in 1991
Quarterly journals
Academic journals associated with learned and professional societies
1991 establishments in the United States